
Year 664 (DCLXIV) was a leap year starting on Monday (link will display the full calendar) of the Julian calendar. The denomination 664 for this year has been used since the early medieval period, when the Anno Domini calendar era became the prevalent method in Europe for naming years.

Events 
 By place 
North America & Europe
 1 May – A solar eclipse affects areas along a line from Central America, through eastern North America, the North Atlantic, Ireland, Britain and Germany.Josiah Cox Russell, 1976, "The earlier medieval plague in the British Isles", Viator vol. 7, pp. 65–78.

Britain & Ireland
 Plague of 664
 According to Bede, a Northumbrian monk and historian, the plague begins shortly after the eclipse of 1 May.
 Adomnan of Iona, a contemporary Irish abbot and saint, writes that the epidemic affects all of Ireland and Britain, except for Dál Riata and Pictland.
  The epidemic significantly depopulates southern coastal areas of England.
 The Kingdom of Gwynedd is also devastated by the plague; King Cadafael Cadomedd dies and is succeeded by Cadwaladr, who reasserts himself in his kingdom by sending his son Ivor from Brittany to be regent.
 King Ealdwulf succeeds Æthelwald as king of East Anglia. He becomes the last ruler recorded known to Bede. During Ealdwulf's reign the plague sweeps across the Anglo-Saxon kingdoms.
 July 14 – The plague claims King Eorcenberht of Kent, who dies after a 24-year reign, and is succeeded by his son Ecgberht. Queen Seaxburh becomes regent, ruling Kent until Ecgberht comes of age.
 King Swithelm of Essex dies after a four-year reign. He is succeeded by his cousins Sighere and Sæbbi (approximate date).
 26 October – The plague claims Cedd, Bishop of London.

 Arabian Empire 
 Muslim Conquest: Arab forces under Al-Muhallab ibn Abi Sufra begin launching raids from Persia, striking at Multan in the southern Punjab (modern Pakistan).  Muslims conquer the city of Kabul, invading from eastern Afghanistan.

 By topic 
 Religion 
 Synod of Whitby: King Oswiu of Northumbria calls for a meeting at Whitby Abbey to settle the church practices in his kingdom—those of the Celtic Church (of Wales, Scotland and the north of England - preached by Irish missionaries) or the Roman Church (of the south of England). The matters discussed include how to calculate the date of Easter. It is decided to follow the practice of Rome. As a result, many Irish clergy leave Northumbria and return to Ireland.

Births 
 Constantine I, Syrian-born pope of the Catholic Church (d. 715)
 Muawiya II, Muslim caliph (d. 684)
 Shangguan Wan'er, Chinese poet (d. 710)

Deaths 
 January 6 – 'Amr ibn al-'As, Arab general
 July 14 – Eorcenberht, king of Kent
 October 26 – Cedd, bishop of London
 Æthelwald, king of East Anglia (approximate date)
 Alhfrith, king of Deira (approximate date)
 Cadafael Cadomedd, king of Gwynedd (Wales)  
 Deusdedit of Canterbury, archbishop of Canterbury
 Swithelm, king of Essex (approximate date)
 Tuda, bishop of Lindisfarne
 Xuanzang, Chinese Buddhist monk and traveler

References

Sources